Ceres is a city in Stanislaus County, California. Its population was 49,302 at the 2020 U.S. Census, up from 45,417 at the 2010 U.S. Census. It is part of the Modesto metropolitan statistical area.

Ceres is located in the San Joaquin Valley along State Route 99, south of Modesto and north of Turlock in Stanislaus County. Ceres is named after the Roman goddess of agriculture.

The newspaper in Ceres is called the Ceres Courier, which has been in publication since 1910. The offices of the Ceres Courier were relocated from an address in downtown Ceres in 2012. It has since combined day-to-day operations with its sister paper, the Turlock Journal, in Turlock. Jeff Benziger, was appointed editor in 1987. The city also has a Spanish-language paper.

Ceres hosts annual events at different times of the year. Spring brings the Ceres Street Faire on the first weekend in May. Concert in the Park is a regular summer event. Halloween Fun Festival marks the fall, followed by the colorful, and much-attended, Christmas Tree Lane opening ceremony.

History
The first non-native families who inhabited Ceres were those of John Service, Cassius Warner, and Daniel Whitmore in  1867. Daniel C. Whitmore is considered the first founding patriarch of Ceres. He built his home in 1870, the Whitmore Mansion at 2928 5th Street. That home still stands, fully restored by the city and the Ceres Historical Society.

In the early 1890s,  outlaws Chris Evans and John Sontag robbed several Southern Pacific Railroad trains at Ceres and several other area locations.

In the late 1930s, a labor camp was developed within the city of Ceres.

The history of Ceres is recounted in Arcadia Publishing Company's Images of America series entitled, "Ceres, by Jeff Benziger. It was released on August 23, 2010.

Geography
According to the U.S. Census Bureau, Ceres has a total area of 8.0 sq mi(20.8 km), 99.9% of it land and 0.1% of it covered by water. The formation of alluvial fans in the San Joaquin Valley has led to a rather flat regional geography. No active earthquake fault traces in the project vicinity are known.  Hydrological feature mapping of the Ceres area has been conducted by the U. S. Geological Survey.

Demographics

2010
The 2010 U.S. Census reported that Ceres had a population of 45,417. The ethnic makeup of Ceres was 26,217 (57.7%) White, 1,185 (2.6%) African American, 609 (1.3%) Native American, 3,093 (6.8%) Asian, 346 (0.8%) Pacific Islander, 11,463 (25.2%) from other races, and 2,504 (5.5%) from two or more races. Hispanics or Latinos of any race were 25,436 persons (56.0%).

The census reported that 45,064 people (99.2% of the population) lived in households, 293 (0.6%) lived in non-institutionalized group quarters, and 60 (0.1%) were institutionalized.

Of the 12,692 households, 6,876 (54.2%) had children under  18 living in them, 7,311 (57.6%) were opposite-sex married couples living together, 2,211 (17.4%) had a female householder with no husband present, and 1,053 (8.3%) had a male householder with no wife present. The city had 976 (7.7%) unmarried opposite-sex partnerships, and 76 (0.6%) same-sex married couples or partnerships; 1,586 households (12.5%) were one person and 628 (4.9%) had someone living alone who was 65 or older. The average household size was 3.55. There were 10,575 families (83.3% of households); the average family size was 3.84.

The age distribution was 14,623 people (32.2%) under 18, 5,108 people (11.2%) aged 18 to 24, 12,506 people (27.5%) aged 25 to 44, 9,667 people (21.3%) aged 45 to 64, and 3,513 people (7.7%) who were 65 or older. The median age was 29.4 years. For every 100 females, there were 97.9 males. For every 100 females age 18 and over, there were 93.9 males.

The 13,673 housing units averaged of 1,704.9/sq mi, and of the occupied units, 8,010 (63.1%) were owner-occupied and 4,682 (36.9%) were rented. The homeowner vacancy rate was 2.5%; the rental vacancy rate was 8.2%; 27,776 people (61.2% of the population) lived in owner-occupied housing units and 17,288 people (38.1%) lived in rental housing units.

2000
As of the 2000 U.S. Census,  34,609 people, 10,435 households, and 8,535 families were in the city. The population density was 4,988.6 people/sq mi (1,925.4/km). The 10,773 housing units at an average density of 1,552.8/sq mi (599.3/km). The ethnic makeup of the city was 64.5% White, 2.8% African American, 1.4% Native American, 5.0% Asian, 0.4% Pacific Islander, 20.4% from other races, and 5.5% from two or more races. Hispanics or Latinos of any race were 37.9% of the population.

Of the 10,435 households, 48.6% had children under  18 living with them, 59.8% were married couples living together, 15.7% had a female householder with no husband present, and 18.2% were not families. About 14.1% of households were one person, and 6.0% were one person aged 65 or older. The average household size was 3.31, and the average family size was 3.62.

The age distribution was 34.4% under  18, 10.1% from 18 to 24, 30.0% from 25 to 44, 17.5% from 45 to 64, and 8.1% 65 or older. The median age was 29 years. For every 100 females, there were 97.0 males. For every 100 females age 18 and over, there were 92.8 males.

The median income foe a household was $40,736 and for a family was $43,587. Males had a median income of $35,109 versus $24,317 for females. The per capita income for the city was $14,420. About 10.1% of families and 12.9% of the population were below the poverty line, including 14.6% of those under age 18 and 10.2% of those age 65 or over.

Government

Economy
Ceres is home to the Bronco Wine Company, makers of Charles Shaw wine, also known as "Two-Buck Chuck".

Parks and recreation
The City of Ceres maintains 11 parks for public use. Ceres's largest park is the Ceres River Bluff Regional Park.

Transportation
Altamont Corridor Express commuter rail train service is expected to be extended to a new station in Ceres by 2023.

Notable people
Cliff Barrows - the ministry partner and announcer at the Billy Graham evangelistic crusades
Gary Condit - former Democratic U.S. Congressman from 1989 to 2002
Gary Duncan - guitarist for Quicksilver Messenger Service
Wayne Hardin - College Football Hall of Famer, former football and basketball coach at Ceres High School
Kenny Pierce - former bass guitar player for Buck Owens' Buckaroos from 1960 to 1962 
Cade Cowell - professional soccer player for San Jose Earthquakes
Sis Bates - softball player for the Washington Huskies

References

External links

History of Ceres
The Ceres Courier

 
Cities in Stanislaus County, California
Geography of the San Joaquin Valley
Incorporated cities and towns in California